Vitruvian Partners is a European private equity firm focusing on leveraged buyout and growth capital investments in middle-market companies.

Vitruvian invests throughout the UK and Europe and recently in China and India. The firm has offices in London, Munich, Madrid, Stockholm,  Shanghai, San Francisco and Luxembourg.

The firm was founded in 2006 by former partners of Apax Partners, BC Partners and Bridgepoint Capital.  In 2008, Vitruvian completed the fundraising for its inaugural €925 million fund, the Vitruvian Investment Partnership I ("VIP I"). In December 2013, Vitruvian announced that it had closed the fundraising of its second fund, Vitruvian Investment Partnership II (“VIP II”), at its self-imposed cap of £1 billion ($1.6 billion; €1.2billion). In June 2017 ,Vitruvian announced that it had closed the fundraising of its third fund, Vitruvian Investment Partnership III (“VIP III”), at the hard cap of €2.4 billion. On 30ly 2030, 20 V,itruvian announced the closing of Vitruvian Investment Partnership IV (“VIP IV”) at the hard cap of €4.0 billion.

Investments

References

Private equity firms of the United Kingdom
Financial services companies based in London
Financial services companies established in 2006